Theo Härder (born August 28, 1945 in Bad Neustadt an der Saale, Germany) is a Professor of Computer Science at the University of Kaiserslautern.

Life and career

Theo Härder studied electrical Engineering at the Department of Electrical Engineering and Information Technology of the Technische Universität Darmstadt, earning his doctorate there in 1975. In 1976 he moved to the IBM Research - Almaden in San Jose, California. In 1977 he returned to TU Darmstadt as a professor at the Department of Computer Science. In 1980 he accepted an appointment at the University of Kaiserslautern in computer science.

Accomplishments

Härder has received numerous awards for outstanding scientific achievements in the field of databases. He participated in the development of System R, the first relational database management system.

In 1983, he and Andreas Reuter coined the acronym ACID to describe the essential characteristics of a distributed relational database (Atomicity, Consistency, Isolation, and Durability).

Awards

Konrad Zuse Medal, 2001
Honorary doctorate from Universität Oldenburg, 2002

References

German computer scientists
1945 births
Living people
Technische Universität Darmstadt alumni
Academic staff of Technische Universität Darmstadt